Almazny is an urban locality (an urban-type settlement) in Mirninsky District of the Sakha Republic, Russia, located  from Mirny, the administrative center of the district, on the border of the Lena and Vilyuy Plateaus, on the Irelyakh River, at its confluence with the Ochchuguy-Botuobuya, a tributary of the Vilyuy. As of the 2010 Census, its population was 1,527.

History
Diamond deposits were discovered in the area in 1954, in conjunction with which the nearby selo of Novy was founded in the same year. Almazny was founded in 1960 as a dormitory settlement for mine workers, and was granted urban-type settlement status in 1962.

Administrative and municipal status
Within the framework of administrative divisions, the urban-type settlement of Almazny, together with two rural localities, is incorporated within Mirninsky District as the Settlement of Almazny. As a municipal division, the Settlement of Almazny is incorporated within Mirninsky Municipal District as Almazny Urban Settlement.

Economy and infrastructure
Employment in Almazny centers on diamond extraction from placer deposits in the valley of the Irelyakh River, using three specially-built semi-stationary dredgers.

Almazny lies on the Vilyuy Highway, which connects the diamond mining town of Mirny with the republic capital of Yakutsk.

References

Notes

Sources
Official website of the Sakha Republic. Registry of the Administrative-Territorial Divisions of the Sakha Republic. Mirninsky District. 

Urban-type settlements in the Sakha Republic